Malépart is a surname. Notable people with the surname include:

 Germaine Malépart (1898–1963), Canadian pianist and music educator
 Jean-Claude Malépart (1938–1989), French Canadian politician
 Nathalie Malépart (born  1973), Canadian politician